The women's 63 kg competition at the 2021 European Judo Championships was held on 17 April at the Altice Arena.

Results

Final

Repechage

Top half

Bottom half

References

External links
 

W63
European Judo Championships Women's Half Middleweight
European W63